Jonas Grønner (born 11 April 1994) is a Norwegian professional footballer who plays for Aalesund, as a defender. He represented Norway U17 in the 2011 UEFA European Under-17 Football Championship qualifying round.

Career statistics

References

1994 births
Living people
Norwegian footballers
Norwegian expatriate footballers
SK Brann players
Aalesunds FK players
Eliteserien players
Knattspyrnufélag Reykjavíkur players
Expatriate footballers in Iceland
Norwegian expatriate sportspeople in Iceland
Association football defenders
Footballers from Bergen